The 2022 Stu Sells 1824 Halifax Classic was held from November 9 to 13 at the Halifax Curling Club in Halifax, Nova Scotia. The event was held in a triple knockout format with a purse of $24,000 on both the men's and women's sides. It was the fifth Stu Sells sponsored event held as part of the 2022–23 season.

Men

Teams
The teams are listed as follows:

Knockout brackets

Source:

A event

B event

C event

Knockout results
All draw times are listed in Atlantic Time (UTC−04:00).
Note: Sheets are ordered 1, 8, 2, 4.

Draw 1
Wednesday, November 9, 9:30 am

Draw 3
Wednesday, November 9, 4:30 pm

Draw 5
Thursday, November 10, 7:45 am

Draw 6
Thursday, November 10, 11:00 am

Draw 7
Thursday, November 10, 2:15 pm

Draw 8
Thursday, November 10, 5:30 pm

Draw 9
Thursday, November 10, 8:45 pm

Draw 10
Friday, November 11, 9:30 am

Draw 11
Friday, November 11, 1:00 pm

Draw 12
Friday, November 11, 4:30 pm

Draw 13
Friday, November 11, 8:00 pm

Draw 15
Saturday, November 12, 1:00 pm

Draw 17
Saturday, November 12, 8:00 pm

Playoffs

Quarterfinals
Sunday, November 13, 11:30 am

Semifinals
Sunday, November 13, 3:00 pm

Final
Sunday, November 13, 6:30 pm

Women

Teams
The teams are listed as follows:

Knockout brackets

Source:

A event

B event

C event

Knockout results
All draw times are listed in Atlantic Time (UTC−04:00).
Note: Sheets are ordered 1, 8, 2, 4.

Draw 2
Wednesday, November 9, 1:00 pm

Draw 4
Wednesday, November 9, 8:00 pm

Draw 5
Thursday, November 10, 7:45 am

Draw 6
Thursday, November 10, 11:00 am

Draw 7
Thursday, November 10, 2:15 pm

Draw 8
Thursday, November 10, 5:30 pm

Draw 9
Thursday, November 10, 8:45 pm

Draw 10
Friday, November 11, 9:30 am

Draw 11
Friday, November 11, 1:00 pm

Draw 12
Friday, November 11, 4:30 pm

Draw 13
Friday, November 11, 8:00 pm

Draw 14
Saturday, November 12, 9:30 am

Draw 16
Saturday, November 12, 4:30 pm

Playoffs

Quarterfinals
Sunday, November 13, 8:00 am

Semifinals
Sunday, November 13, 3:00 pm

Final
Sunday, November 13, 6:30 pm

Notes

References

External links
Men's Event
Women's Event

2022 in Canadian curling
Curling in Nova Scotia
November 2022 sports events in Canada
2022 in Nova Scotia